The Big Ten Conference Coach of the Year is a college softball award given to the Big Ten Conference's most outstanding coach. The award has been given annually since 1985.

Key

Winners

Winners by school

References

Awards established in 1985
Coach
NCAA Division I softball conference coaches of the year